CFET-FM is a Canadian radio station, broadcasting at 106.7 FM in Tagish, Yukon.

The station was licensed in 2002, and was launched in 2003 by Rob Hopkins, the station broadcasts a classic rock and community radio format.

On August 30, 2012, Robert G. Hopkins received approval to add a low-power FM transmitter at Haines Junction, Yukon. The new transmitter will operate at 99.9 MHz.

References

External links
 www.cfetradio.com
 

Radio stations in Yukon
Classic rock radio stations in Canada
Community radio stations in Canada